Me Time is a 2022 American buddy comedy film written and directed by John Hamburg. The film stars Kevin Hart, Mark Wahlberg, Regina Hall, Luis Gerardo Méndez, and Jimmy O. Yang. It is about a stay-at-home dad as he finds himself with some "me time" for the first time in years while his wife and kids are away. He reconnects with his former best friend Huck for a wild weekend that nearly upends his life.

Me Time was released on August 26, 2022, by Netflix. It received generally negative reviews.

Plot
Best friends since high school, Sonny and Huck stopped meeting up every year on Huck's birthday 15 years ago when Sonny had a near death experience.

Now Sonny is a stay-at-home dad, putting all of his focus on his family. Huck contacts him, as he does every year, for the annual celebration. However not wanting to attend, Sonny finds himself with some "me time" for the first time in years while his wife and kids are away. 

After only a few days, Sonny is bored. He plays golf every day but is terrible, partakes of massive amounts of food at a big barbecue a few days in a row but projectile vomits, none of his friends can participate with him so he's lonely and bored and his kids don't seem to miss him.

So Sonny ends up going to Huck's wild weekend birthday bash. Arriving at the meeting point, everyone is skinny dipping. Afterwards they load onto Huck's chartered bus and put on matching track suits.

Meanwhile, Sonny's wife Maya and kids get a visit at the place her parents have taken them to from her wealthy client Armando, who Sonny fears is interested in her. 

The bus dumps the party group in the desert, where there are communal yurts set up, and the plan is to forage for their food. They are given hardware to do it, so Sonny heads off to do number two. A mountain lion chases him, but he wards it off by stabbing it with an EpiPen, and is nicknamed Big Dog.  

That evening, when Sonny calls his family, he finds out Armando visited them by seaplane. Maya is offered a big project. Jealous, when he yells they hang up on him. 

Stan, Huck's loan shark arrives, seeking the $47,000 owed him. His muscle Dorit breaks Sonny's finger, then burns down the site. Once everyone goes, Sonny stays behind to help Huck salvage what they can. Huck confesses he's fallen on hard times and is lonely. 

On their way back to LA in an Uber, Sonny spots Armando's. The three break in and pull off some gross pranks, but inadvertently hit one of his tortoises. All is caught on camera. 

Sonny offers his house for Huck to continue his birthday celebration, as his family is still away. Someone shares a party notification via social media, and it becomes a rager. Seal comes, and Sonny jams with him. Just as the party is at the most out of control the family shows up, and Maya leaves with the kids. She asks him to clear out and stay away for a bit.

While they are separated, Sonny tries to make amends, apologizing to Armando and working hard on the talent show. As the closing act Dash, Sonny's son, has a meltdown declaring he hates the keyboard. Realising he's been selfish and overcontrolling, he apologizes to everyone, encouraging all who want to perform. 

Sonny chases down Huck, convincing him to join him in a party planner company.

Cast
 Kevin Hart as Sonny Fisher
 Mark Wahlberg as Huck Dembo
 Regina Hall as Maya Fisher, Sonny's wife
 Luis Gerardo Méndez as Armando Zavala
 Jimmy O. Yang as Stan Berman
 John Amos as Gil
 Anna Maria Horsford as Connie
 Andrew Santino as Alan Geller
 Deborah S. Craig as Bethany
 Naomi Ekperigin as Jill
 Drew Droege as Combover Stew
 Ilia Isorelys Paulino as Thelma
 Tahj Mowry as Kabir
 Carlo Rota as Alberto
 Che Tafari as Dashiell Fisher, Sonny and Maya's son
 Amentii Sledge as Ava Fisher, Sonny and Maya's daughter
 Seal as himself

Production
In February 2021, Kevin Hart joined the cast. In August, Mark Wahlberg and Regina Hall were added to the cast. In September 2021, Jimmy O. Yang and Luis Gerardo Méndez joined the cast. Filming took place at Sunset Gower Studios. On September 14, a stage technician was taken to a local regional trauma center after suffering a 30-foot fall on set.

Release
The film was released on August 26, 2022, by Netflix.

Reception 
  This is the lowest-rated film on the site to feature Mark Wahlberg (and the second-lowest to feature Kevin Hart).

Tomris Laffly of RogerEbert.com gave Me Time a moderately favorable review, praising the characters but criticizing the screenplay and special effects. Peter Travers of ABC News was more critical of the film, calling it "dim-witted and disposable".

References

External links
 

2020s English-language films
American comedy films
English-language Netflix original films
Films directed by John Hamburg
Films shot in Los Angeles
Films with screenplays by John Hamburg
African-American comedy films
2022 comedy films
2020s American films
American buddy comedy films
African-American films